The 1933 King's Birthday Honours in New Zealand, celebrating the official birthday of King George V, were appointments made by the King to various orders and honours to reward and highlight good works by New Zealanders. They were announced on 3 June 1933.

The recipients of honours are displayed here as they were styled before their new honour.

Knight Bachelor
 Hugh Thomas Dyke Acland  – of Christchurch; vice president of the Dominion Council of the Australian College of Surgeons.

Order of Saint Michael and Saint George

Companion (CMG)
 John Saxon Barton – stipendiary magistrate, Napier. For public services.
 Thomas Lindsay Buick – of Wellington. For public services.

Order of the British Empire

Knight Commander (KBE)
Civil division
 Colonel Stephen Shepherd Allen   – of Morrinsville; formerly administrator of Western Samoa.

Officer (OBE)
 Makea Nui Tinirau Ariki – of Rarotonga; paramount chief of Cook Island.

Companion of the Imperial Service Order (ISO)
 Theophilus Benjamin Strong  – lately director of education.

References

Birthday Honours
1933 awards
1933 in New Zealand
New Zealand awards